Peter Kyle (September 1880 – 1961) was a Scottish footballer.

Career
Born in Rutherglen, Glasgow, Kyle played at centre-forward, first for junior clubs Larkhill and Royal Albert before joining Clyde. Reportedly rejected by Clyde due to his fierce temper, he moved south of the border to join Liverpool in 1899, and figured for Liverpool in their first four games of the 1899–1900 season, but lost his place to John Walker and only played one more match that season. Unhappy with reserve-team football, he left in summer 1900 and went on to play for a range of Southern League clubs, including Leicester City (1900–01), West Ham United (1901–02), Kettering Town (1902–05) and Tottenham Hotspur (1905–06). At Tottenham, he was reportedly involved in a fracas with teammate Christopher Carrick and suspended by the club.

In April 1906 he joined Woolwich Arsenal and made his debut on the first day of the 1906-07, in Arsenal's First Division win over Manchester City on 1 September 1906. That season, he was prolific in front of goal, scoring thirteen goals in 29 league appearances (although Charlie Satterthwaite was Arsenal's top scorer that season) as Arsenal finished seventh. The following season, Kyle was the Reds' top scorer with nine goals (eight in the league and one in the FA Cup), although Arsenal's form was much poorer and they only finished 14th.

With the club strapped for cash, Kyle was sold to keep the club's finances viable, to Aston Villa in March 1908. In all he scored 23 goals in 60 appearances for Woolwich Arsenal. Kyle was not as big a success at Villa as he had been with Arsenal, and after less than a year he had moved on to Sheffield United, (with Robert Evans for a combined fee of £1100). He finished his career back in the Southern League with Watford.

References

External links
Aston Villa profile

1880 births
1961 deaths
Scottish footballers
Association football forwards
Clyde F.C. players
Liverpool F.C. players
Leicester City F.C. players
West Ham United F.C. players
Tottenham Hotspur F.C. players
Sportspeople from Rutherglen
Arsenal F.C. players
Aston Villa F.C. players
Sheffield United F.C. players
Watford F.C. players
Footballers from South Lanarkshire